MPPE may refer to:
Microsoft Point-to-Point Encryption, a data encryption protocol
Modified polyphenyl ether, a type of phenyl ether polymer

j